A spaceplane incorporates aspects of both aeroplanes and spacecraft. Most concepts were only capable of sub-orbital spaceflight.

|-
| ASSET || US || Rocket launch || Experimental || 1963 || Prototype ||  || Uncrewed reentry test vehicle.
|-
| Boeing X-20 Dyna-Soar || US || Rocket launch || Experimental || 1963 || Project ||  || Crewed
|-
| Boeing X-37 || US || Rocket launch || Utility || 2010 || Prototype ||  || Robotic orbiter operated by the United States Armed Forces. 
|-
| BOR-4 || USSR || Rocket launch || Experimental || 1982 || Prototype ||  || Uncrewed reentry test vehicle.
|-
| Buran Shuttle || USSR || Rocket launch || Utility || 1988 || Prototype ||  || Crewed orbiter, launched by the Energia rocket. Only one robotic flight made.
|-
| Dream Chaser ||USA|| Rocket launch || Utility || 2004|| Project||  || Uncrewed orbiter, originally intended as a crew vehicle. launched by a Vulcan-Centaur rocket. 
|- 
|HOTOL || UK || SSTO || Utility || 1988 || Project || 0 || Airbreathing rocket engine.
|- 
| Interim HOTOL || UK || Air launch || Utility || 1991 || Project || 0 || Launched from the Antonov An-225 Mriya, the Buran air lift carrier aircraft.
|-
| Martin X-23 PRIME || US || Rocket launch || Experimental || 1966 || Prototype ||  || Uncrewed atmospheric re-entry test vehicle
|-
| North American X-15 || US || Air launch || Experimental || 1959 || Prototype || 3 || Air-dropped from a Boeing B-52.
|-
| Sanger Silbervogel || Germany || Composite || Bomber || 1944 || Project || 0 || Sub-orbital. Mock up and wind tunnel models only.
|-
| Scaled Composites SpaceShipOne || US || Composite || Transport || 2004 || Prototype || 1 || first civilian-funded reusable spacecraft, lifted by White Knight to about 14 km
|-
| Scaled Composites SpaceShipTwo || US || Composite || Transport || 2010 || Prototype || 2 || For Virgin Galactic commercial testing.
|-
| Skylon || UK || SSTO || Utility || 1993 || Project ||  || Continuation of cancelled HOTOL.
|-
| Space Rider || ESA || Lifting body || Experimental || 2021 || Project ||  || Robotic, orbital
|-
| Space Shuttle || US || Rocket launch || Utility || 1981 || Retired || 4–8 || Crewed orbiter.
|-
| XCOR Lynx (formerly Xerus) || US || Suborbital || Experimental || 2008 || Project || 0 || Horizontal takeoff and landing.
|}

See also
 Lists of spacecraft
 List of space launch system designs
 Mother ship

Spaceplanes
Spaceplanes
Lists of aircraft by role